The 2007 Florida Gators baseball team represented the University of Florida in the sport of baseball during the 2007 college baseball season. The Gators competed in Division I of the National Collegiate Athletic Association (NCAA) and the Eastern Division of the Southeastern Conference (SEC). They played their home games at Alfred A. McKethan Stadium, on the university's Gainesville, Florida campus. The team was coached by Pat McMahon, who was in his sixth and final season at Florida. McMahon was dismissed after the conclusion of the season, following two consecutive years without a winning record.

Roster

Schedule 

! style="background:#FF4A00;color:white;"| Regular season
|- valign="top" 

|- align="center" bgcolor="ffdddd"
| February 9 ||||
| McKethan Stadium ||3–5||Barham (1–0)
|Augenstein (0–1)
|Crum (1)
|3,856
|0–1|| –
|- align="center" bgcolor="ffdddd"
| February 10 ||VMI||
| McKethan Stadium ||4–7||Bowman (1–0)
|Locke (0–1)
|Crum (2)
|3,225
|0–2|| –
|- align="center" bgcolor="ddffdd"
| February 11 ||VMI||
| McKethan Stadium ||7–0||Bullock (1–0)
|Smink (0–1)
|None
|2,841
|1–2
| –
|- align="center" bgcolor="ddffdd"
| February 13 ||||
|McKethan Stadium
|15–1||Chapman (1–0)
|Smith (0–3)
|None
|1,262
|2–2
| –
|- align="center" bgcolor="ddffdd"
| February 16 ||No. 13 Rivalry||
|McKethan Stadium||7–2||Augenstein (1–1)
|Maine (1–1)
|None
|3,789
|3–2
| –
|- align="center" bgcolor="ddffdd"
| February 17 ||No. 13 Miami (FL)Rivalry||
| McKethan Stadium ||7–5||Keating (1–0)
|Erickson (0–1)
|Hurst (1)
|4,427
|4–2
| –
|- align="center" bgcolor="ffdddd"
| February 18 ||No. 13 Miami (FL)Rivalry||
| McKethan Stadium ||7–10||Santana (1–0)
|Bullock (1–1)
|Garcia (1)
|3,867
|4–3|| –
|- align="center" bgcolor="ffdddd"
| February 20 ||No. 2 Rivalry||
| McKethan Stadium ||6–14||Burge (1–0)
|Chapman (1–1)
|None
|5,140
|4–4|| –
|- align="center" bgcolor="ffdddd"
| February 23 ||||
| McKethan Stadium ||4–10||Pacella (1–0)
|Augenstein (1–2)
|Lamport (1)
|3,060
|4–5|| –
|- align="center" bgcolor="ddffdd"
| February 24 ||Kent State||
|McKethan Stadium
|7–0||Locke (1–1)
|Rodgers (0–2)
|None
|3,113
|5–5|| –
|- align="center" bgcolor="ffdddd"
| February 25 ||Kent State||
|McKethan Stadium||0–1||Smith (1–0)
|Bullock (1–2)
|Davis (1)
|2,761
|5–6|| –
|- align="center" bgcolor="ddffdd"
| February 27 ||at ||
|Red McEwen FieldTampa, FL||10–5||Mullaney (1–0)
|Otero (3–1)
|None
|2,426
|6–6|| –
|-

|- align="center" bgcolor="ddffdd"
| March 3 (1) ||||||McKethan Stadium||7–1||Augenstein (2–2)||Frazier (0–3)||None||–||7–6||–
|- align="center" bgcolor="ddffdd"
| March 3 (2) ||George Washington||||McKethan Stadium
|24–4||Locke (2–1)||Haese (0–3)||None||2,636||8–6
|–
|- align="center" bgcolor="ddffdd"
| March 4 ||George Washington||||McKethan Stadium||20–3||Bullock (2–2)||Lucas (0–1)||None||3,168||9–6
|–
|- align="center" bgcolor="ffdddd"
| March 6 |||||| McKethan Stadium ||5–6||Gardner (2–2)||Edmondson (0–1)||None||3,730||9–7
|–
|- align="center" bgcolor="ffdddd"
| March 9 ||at No. 9 ||||Olsen FieldCollege Station, TX
|1–7||Newmann (3–0)||Augenstein (2–3)||None||3,165||9–8
|–
|- align="center" bgcolor="ffdddd"
| March 10 ||at No. 9 Texas A&M||||Olsen Field||5–13||Thebeau (2–0)||Locke (2–2)||None||4,154||9–9
|–
|- align="center" bgcolor="ffdddd"
| March 11 ||at No. 9 Texas A&M||||Olsen Field
|1–6||Nicholson (4–1)||Bullock (2–3)||None||3,577||9–10
|–
|- align="center" bgcolor="ddffdd"
| March 14 ||||||McKethan Stadium
|5–3||Edmondson (1–1)||Mayhew (0–4)||Keating (1)||3,130||10–10
|–
|- align="center" bgcolor="ffdddd"
| March 16 ||Mississippi State||||McKethan Stadium
|9–12||Weatherford (3–0)||Porter (0–1)||Lalor (1)||3,281||10–11
|0–1
|- align="center" bgcolor="ddffdd"
| March 17 ||Mississippi State|||| McKethan Stadium ||10–8||Locke (3–2)||Pigott (2–2)||Porter (1)||3,151||11–11
|1–1
|- align="center" bgcolor="ffdddd"
| March 18 ||Mississippi State||||McKethan Stadium
|||Crosswhite (2–1)||Keating (1–1)||Moreland (1)||3,316||11–12
|1–2
|- align="center" bgcolor="ffdddd"
| March 20 ||at ||||Melching FieldDeLand, FL
|3–4||Donovan (1–1)||Franklin (0–1)||Elsemiller (9)||2,975||11–13
|–
|- align="center" bgcolor="ddffdd"
| March 23 ||at ||||Plainsman ParkAuburn, AL
|8–710||Keating (2–1)||Dennis (1–2)||None||3,187||12–13
|2–2
|- align="center" bgcolor="ddffdd"
| March 24 ||at Auburn||||Plainsman Park
|12–9||Edmondson (2–1)||Bristow (1–2)||Hurst (2)||2,917||13–13
|3–2
|- align="center" bgcolor="ddffdd"
| March 25 ||at Auburn||||Plainsman Park
|10–3||Hurst (1–0)||Crawford (3–2)||None||2,387||14–13
|4–2
|- align="center" bgcolor="ddffdd"
| March 27 ||||||McKethan Stadium
|5–3||Davis (1–0)||Burgos (1–4)||Keating (2)||2,779||15–13
|–
|- align="center" bgcolor="ddffdd"
| March 30 ||at ||||Foley FieldAthens, GA
|7–5||Augenstein (3–3)||Moreau (2–1)||Porter (2)||2,929||16–13
|5–2
|- align="center" bgcolor="ddffdd"
| March 31 ||at Georgia||||Foley Field||9–1||Davis (2–0)||Dodson (1–4)||Hurst (3)||2,959||17–13
|6–2
|-

|- align="center" bgcolor="ddffdd"
| April 1 ||at Georgia||||Foley Field
|3–211||Mullaney (2–0)||Fields (1–4)||None||1,545||18–13||7–2
|- align="center" bgcolor="ddffdd"
| April 3 ||vs. No. 1 Florida StateRivalry||No. 22||Baseball GroundsJacksonville, FL||16–7||Chapman (2–1)||Graham (1–2)||None||12,280||19–13||–
|- align="center" bgcolor="ffdddd"
| April 6 ||No. 5 ||No. 22||McKethan Stadium
|2–12||Honeycutt (7–0)||Augenstein (3–4)||None||4,090||19–14||7–3
|- align="center" bgcolor="ddffdd"
| April 7 ||No. 5 South Carolina||No. 22||McKethan Stadium||9–8||Hurst (2–0)||Pelzer (1–2)||None||3,651||20–14||8–3
|- align="center" bgcolor="ffdddd"
| April 8 ||No. 5 South Carolina||No. 22||McKethan Stadium
|6–811||Jeffords (3–0)||Porter (0–2)||None||3,122||20–15
|8–4
|- align="center" bgcolor="ffdddd"
| April 10 ||||No. 17||McKethan Stadium
|2–6
|Sweat (3–2)||Locke (3–3)||Weiss (5)||2,874||20–16
|–
|- align="center" bgcolor="ffdddd"
| April 14 (1) ||at No. 5 ||No. 17||Baum StadiumFayetteville, AR||3–14||Schmidt (8–0)||Davis (2–1)||None||–||20–17
|8–5
|- align="center" bgcolor="ffdddd"
| April 14 (2) ||at No. 5 Arkansas||No. 17||Baum Stadium
|1–7||Welker (5–2)||Bullock (2–4)||None||8,184||20–18
|8–6
|- align="center" bgcolor="ffdddd"
| April 15 ||at No. 5 Arkansas||No. 17||Baum Stadium
|7–10||Hill (2–1)||Porter (0–3)||None||8,326||20–19
|8–7
|- align="center" bgcolor="ddffdd"
| April 18 ||at No. 1 Florida StateRivalry||||Dick Howser StadiumTallahassee, FL||5–4||Gawriluk (1–0)||O'Dell (3–1)||Hurst (4)||6,574||21–19
|–
|- align="center" bgcolor="ffdddd"
| April 20 ||||||McKethan Stadium
|2–9||Rusin (4–2)||Davis (2–2)||None||3,095||21–20||8–8
|- align="center" bgcolor="ddffdd"
| April 21 ||Kentucky||||McKethan Stadium
|10–7||Augenstein (4–4)||Albers (5–2)||Hurst (5)||3,342||22–20||9–8
|- align="center" bgcolor="ddffdd"
| April 22 ||Kentucky||||McKethan Stadium||5–4
|Keating (3–1)||Oxford (3–1)||None||3,004||23–20||10–8
|- align="center" bgcolor="ffdddd"
| April 27 ||at No. 2 ||||Hawkins FieldNashville, TN
|1–10||Price (8–0)||Mullaney (2–1)||None||2,524
|23–21
|10–9
|- align="center" bgcolor="ffdddd"
| April 28 ||at No. 2 Vanderbilt||||Hawkins Field||6–17
|Davis (1–0)||Augenstein (4–5)||None||2,625||23–22
|10–10
|- align="center" bgcolor="ffdddd"
| April 29 ||at No. 2 Vanderbilt||||Hawkins Field||5–13||Crowell (2–1)||Bullock (2–5)||None||2,477||23–23
|10–11
|-

|- align="center" bgcolor="ddffdd"
| May 4 ||||||McKethan Stadium
|6–2
|Mullaney (3–1)||Hunter (5–4)||Hurst (6)||3,327||24–23
|11–11
|- align="center" bgcolor="ddffdd"
| May 5 ||Alabama||||McKethan Stadium||9–3||Augenstein (5–5)||Quigley (4–5)||None||3,159||25–23
|12–11
|- align="center" bgcolor="ffdddd"
| May 6 ||Alabama||||McKethan Stadium||5–710||Hyatt (5–1)||Hurst (2–1)||None||3,056||25–24
|12–12
|- align="center" bgcolor="ffdddd"
| May 8 ||||||McKethan Stadium||8–15||Stilley (1–2)||Franklin (0–2)||Sheppard (1)||2,845||25–25
|–
|- align="center" bgcolor="ddffdd"
| May 11 ||at ||||Alex Box StadiumBaton Rouge, LA
|19–3||Mullaney (4–1)||Bradford (10–3)||None||7,582||26–25
|13–12
|- align="center" bgcolor="ddffdd"
| May 12 ||at LSU||||Alex Box Stadium||8–4||Augenstein (6–5)||Furbush (3–8)||None||7,674||27–25
|14–12
|- align="center" bgcolor="ffdddd"
| May 13 ||at LSU||||Alex Box Stadium||4–9||Byrd (6–1)||Bullock (2–6)||Forrest (1)||7,092||27–26
|14–13
|- align="center" bgcolor="ffdddd"
| May 17 ||||||McKethan Stadium||5–6||Adkins (6–7)||Mullaney (4–2)||Lockwood (7)||2,681||27–27
|14–14
|- align="center" bgcolor="ddffdd"
| May 18 ||Tennessee|||| McKethan Stadium ||20–2||Augenstein (7–5)||Hernandez (4–3)||None||3,340||28–27
|15–14
|- align="center" bgcolor="ffdddd"
| May 19 ||Tennessee|||| McKethan Stadium ||7–11||Cobb (8–5)||Bullock (2–7)||Lockwood (8)||2,829||28–28
|15–15
|-

|-
! style="background:#FF4A00;color:white;"| Post-season
|-

|- align="center" bgcolor="ffdddd"
| May 23 ||  |||| Regions ParkHoover, AL || 3–412 ||Jeffords (6–1)||Hurst (2–2)||None||5,746||28–29||0–1
|- align="center" bgcolor="ddffdd"
| May 24 || vs. Alabama |||| Regions Park || 3–2 ||Augenstein (8–5)||Stroup (3–1)||None||5,782||29–29||1–1
|- align="center" bgcolor="ffdddd"
| May 25 ||  |||| Regions Park || 3–5 ||Cisco (6–2)||Keating (3–2)||Jeffords (4)||6,137||29–30||1–2
|-

Rankings from Collegiate Baseball. All times Eastern. Retrieved from FloridaGators.com

See also 
 Florida Gators
 List of Florida Gators baseball players

References

External links 
 Gator Baseball official website

Florida Gators baseball seasons
Florida Gators baseball team
Florida Gators